Adrián Gorelik (Mercedes, Argentina, 1957) is an architect, urban historian and leading commentator on urban issues in Argentina. In 2003 he was awarded a Guggenheim Fellowship for a project entitled “The cycle of invention and critique of the ‘Latin American City’.”

Gorelik is currently a professor at the National University of Quilmes, Buenos Aires, as well as a researcher in the Intellectual History Program there. In 2002 he was a Visiting Fellow at the Centre of Latin American Studies at the University of Cambridge.

Gorelik received a degree in architecture (1982) and a Ph.D. in History from the University of Buenos Aires (1997).

Selected publications
 “The Past as the Future: A Reactive Utopia in Buenos Aires” (with Graciela Silvestri) in Ana del Sarto, Alicia Rios, Abril Trigo, eds. The Latin American Cultural Studies Reader. Duke University Press, 2004.
 Buenos Aires (with Horacio Coppola Facundo de Zuviria). Lariviere, 2006.
 Miradas Sobre Buenos Aires. Siglo XXI Ediciones, 2004.
 La Grilla y el Parque. Universidad Nacional de Quilmes, 2001.
 Buenos Aires en cuestión. Centro para la Gestión Urbana, 1993.

References

External links
 National University of Quilmes faculty page

Living people
1957 births
20th-century Argentine historians
Argentine male writers
Architects from Buenos Aires
Historians of urban planning
People from Mercedes, Buenos Aires
Male non-fiction writers
21st-century Argentine historians